Moutonnet is a 1936 French comedy film directed by René Sti and starring Noël-Noël, Lucien Rozenberg and Michel Simon.

Cast
 Noël-Noël as Moutonnet et Mérac  
 Lucien Rozenberg as Dumonthal  
 Michel Simon as Frècheville  
 Janine Crispin as Élise  
 Suzy Prim as Dolly  
 Aline Debray as L'amie d'Élise  
 Paul Azaïs as Le garçon d'étage  
 Rodolphe Marcilly as L'esthète prétentieux 
 Léon Arvel 
 Nina Bertin 
 Jacques B. Brunius 
 Marcel Carpentier 
 Eddy Debray 
 Jean Deiss
 Allain Dhurtal 
 Marcel Duhamel 
 Louis Florencie 
 Anthony Gildès 
 Paul Gury 
 Claire Gérard 
 Marcel Lupovici 
 Albert Malbert 
 Gaston Mauger 
 Marcel Melrac 
 Georges Montel 
 Georges Paulais 
 Émile Saint-Ober 
 René Wheeler

References

Bibliography 
 Crisp, Colin. Genre, Myth and Convention in the French Cinema, 1929-1939. Indiana University Press, 2002.

External links 
 

1936 comedy films
French comedy films
1936 films
1930s French-language films
French black-and-white films
1930s French films